Slavic, Slav or Slavonic may refer to:

Peoples 
 Slavic peoples, an ethno-linguistic group living in Europe and Asia
 East Slavic peoples, eastern group of Slavic peoples
 South Slavic peoples, southern group of Slavic peoples
 West Slavic peoples, western group of Slavic peoples
 Slavic Americans, Americans of Slavic descent
 Anti-Slavic sentiment, negative attitude towards Slavic peoples
 Pan-Slavic movement, movement in favor of Slavic cooperation and unity
 Slavic studies, a multidisciplinary field of studies focused on history and culture of Slavic peoples

Languages, alphabets, and names 

 Slavic languages, a group of closely related Indo-European languages
 Proto-Slavic language, reconstructed proto-language of all Slavic languages
 Old Church Slavonic, 9th century Slavic literary language, used for the purpose of evangelizing the Slavic peoples
 Church Slavonic, a written and spoken variant of Old Church Slavonic, standardized and widely adopted by Slavs in the Middle Ages, and became a liturgical language in many Eastern Orthodox churches
 Pan-Slavic language, artificially created languages intended to serve as a lingua franca for all Slavic peoples
 East Slavic languages, modern languages of East Slavic peoples
 South Slavic languages, modern languages of South Slavic peoples
 West Slavic languages, modern languages of West Slavic peoples
 Slavic names, names originating from the Slavic languages

Mythology and faith 
 Slavic mythology, the mythological aspect of the polytheistic religion that was practised by the Slavs before Christianisation
 Slavic dragon, mythological creature in ancient Slavic culture
 Slavic Native Faith, modern form of ancient Slavic polytheism

Places 
 Slav (village), a former Israeli settlement in the Gaza Strip

Other 
 Slav Defense, a chess opening
 Slavic calendar, traditional Slavic calendar

See also
 Slavonian (disambiguation)
 Slavyansky (disambiguation)